Java Database Connectivity (JDBC) is an application programming interface (API) for the Java programming language, which defines how a client may access a database. It is a Java-based data access technology used for Java database connectivity.  It is part of the Java Standard Edition platform, from Oracle Corporation. It provides methods to query and update data in a database, and is oriented toward relational databases. A JDBC-to-ODBC bridge enables connections to any ODBC-accessible data source in the Java virtual machine (JVM) host environment.

History and implementation
Sun Microsystems released JDBC as part of Java Development Kit (JDK) 1.1 on February 19, 1997.
Since then it has been part of the Java Platform, Standard Edition (Java SE).

Starting with version 3.1, JDBC has been developed under the Java Community Process.  JSR 54 specifies JDBC 3.0 (included in J2SE 1.4), JSR 114 specifies the JDBC Rowset additions, and JSR 221 is the specification of JDBC 4.0 (included in Java SE 6).

JDBC 4.1, is specified by a maintenance release 1 of JSR 221 and is included in Java SE 7.

JDBC 4.2, is specified by a maintenance release 2 of JSR 221 and is included in Java SE 8.

The latest version, JDBC 4.3, is specified by a maintenance release 3 of JSR 221 and is included in Java SE 9.

Functionality

JDBC ('Java Database Connectivity') allows multiple implementations to exist and be used by the same application. The API provides a mechanism for dynamically loading the correct Java packages and registering them with the JDBC Driver Manager. The Driver Manager is used as a connection factory for creating JDBC connections.

JDBC connections support creating and executing statements. These may be update statements such as SQL's CREATE, INSERT, UPDATE and DELETE, or they may be query statements such as SELECT. Additionally, stored procedures may be invoked through a JDBC connection. JDBC represents statements using one of the following classes:
  – the statement is sent to the database server each and every time.
  – the statement is cached and then the execution path is pre-determined on the database server allowing it to be executed multiple times in an efficient manner.
  – used for executing stored procedures on the database.

Update statements such as INSERT, UPDATE and DELETE return an update count that indicates how many rows were affected in the database. These statements do not return any other information.

Query statements return a JDBC row result set. The row result set is used to walk over the result set. Individual columns in a row are retrieved either by name or by column number. There may be any number of rows in the result set. The row result set has metadata that describes the names of the columns and their types.

JDBC connections are often managed via a connection pool rather than obtained directly from the driver.

Examples

When a Java application needs a database connection, one of the DriverManager.getConnection() methods is used to create a JDBC connection. The URL used is dependent upon the particular database and JDBC driver. It will always begin with the "jdbc:" protocol, but the rest is up to the particular vendor.

Connection conn = DriverManager.getConnection(
     "jdbc:somejdbcvendor:other data needed by some jdbc vendor",
     "myLogin",
     "myPassword");
try {
     /* you use the connection here */
} finally {
    //It's important to close the connection when you are done with it
    try { 
        conn.close();
    } catch (Throwable e) { /* Propagate the original exception
                                instead of this one that you want just logged */ 
        logger.warn("Could not close JDBC Connection",e);
    }
}

Starting from Java SE 7 you can use Java's try-with-resources statement to make the above code simpler:
try (Connection conn = DriverManager.getConnection(
     "jdbc:somejdbcvendor:other data needed by some jdbc vendor",
     "myLogin",
     "myPassword")) {
     /* you use the connection here */
}  // the VM will take care of closing the connection

Once a connection is established, a statement can be created.

try (Statement stmt = conn.createStatement()) {
    stmt.executeUpdate("INSERT INTO MyTable(name) VALUES ('my name')");
}

Note that Connections, Statements, and ResultSets often tie up operating system resources such as sockets or file descriptors. In the case of Connections to remote database servers, further resources are tied up on the server, e.g., cursors for currently open ResultSets.
It is vital to close() any JDBC object as soon as it has played its part;
garbage collection should not be relied upon.
The above try-with-resources construct is a code pattern that obviates this.

Data is retrieved from the database using a database query mechanism. The example below shows creating a statement and executing a query.

try (Statement stmt = conn.createStatement();
    ResultSet rs = stmt.executeQuery("SELECT * FROM MyTable")
) {
    while (rs.next()) {
        int numColumns = rs.getMetaData().getColumnCount();
        for (int i = 1; i <= numColumns; i++) {
           // Column numbers start at 1.
           // Also there are many methods on the result set to return
           //  the column as a particular type. Refer to the Sun documentation
           //  for the list of valid conversions.
           System.out.println( "COLUMN " + i + " = " + rs.getObject(i));
        }
    }
}

An example of a PreparedStatement query, using conn and class from first example.

try (PreparedStatement ps =
    conn.prepareStatement("SELECT i.*, j.* FROM Omega i, Zappa j WHERE i.name = ? AND j.num = ?")
) {
    // In the SQL statement being prepared, each question mark is a placeholder
    // that must be replaced with a value you provide through a "set" method invocation.
    // The following two method calls replace the two placeholders; the first is
    // replaced by a string value, and the second by an integer value.
    ps.setString(1, "Poor Yorick");
    ps.setInt(2, 8008);

    // The ResultSet, rs, conveys the result of executing the SQL statement.
    // Each time you call rs.next(), an internal row pointer, or cursor,
    // is advanced to the next row of the result.  The cursor initially is
    // positioned before the first row.
    try (ResultSet rs = ps.executeQuery()) {
        while (rs.next()) {
            int numColumns = rs.getMetaData().getColumnCount();
            for (int i = 1; i <= numColumns; i++) {
                // Column numbers start at 1.
                // Also there are many methods on the result set to return
                // the column as a particular type. Refer to the Sun documentation
                // for the list of valid conversions.
                System.out.println("COLUMN " + i + " = " + rs.getObject(i));
            } // for
        } // while
    } // try
} // try

There is typically very little one can do to recover from such an error, apart from logging it with as much detail as possible. It is recommended that the SQLException be translated into an application domain exception (an unchecked one) that eventually results in a transaction rollback and a notification to the user.

An example of a database transaction:
boolean autoCommitDefault = conn.getAutoCommit();
try {
    conn.setAutoCommit(false);

    /* You execute statements against conn here transactionally */

    conn.commit();
} catch (Throwable e) {
    try { conn.rollback(); } catch (Throwable e) { logger.warn("Could not rollback transaction", e); }
    throw e;
} finally {
    try { conn.setAutoCommit(autoCommitDefault); } catch (Throwable e) { logger.warn("Could not restore AutoCommit setting",e); }
}

For an example of a CallableStatement (to call stored procedures in the database), see the  documentation.

import java.sql.Connection;
import java.sql.DriverManager;
import java.sql.Statement;

public class Mydb1 {
   static String URL = "jdbc:mysql://localhost/mydb";

   public static void main(String[] args) {
      try {
        Class.forName("com.mysql.jdbc.Driver");

        Connection conn = DriverManager.getConnection(URL, "root", "root");
        Statement stmt = conn.createStatement();
      
        String sql = "INSERT INTO emp1 VALUES ('pctb5361', 'kiril', 'john', 968666668)";
        stmt.executeUpdate(sql);
           
        System.out.println("Inserted records into the table...");
      } catch (Exception e) {
        e.printStackTrace();
      }
   }
}

JDBC drivers

JDBC drivers are client-side adapters (installed on the client machine, not on the server) that convert requests from Java programs to a protocol that the DBMS can understand.

Types
Commercial and free drivers provide connectivity to most relational-database servers. These drivers fall into one of the following types:

 Type 1 that calls native code of the locally available ODBC driver. (Note: In JDBC 4.2, JDBC-ODBC bridge has been removed)
 Type 2 that calls database vendor native library on a client side. This code then talks to database over the network.
 Type 3, the pure-java driver that talks with the server-side middleware that then talks to the database.
 Type 4, the pure-java driver that uses database native protocol.

Note also a type called an internal JDBC driver - a driver embedded with JRE in Java-enabled SQL databases. It is used for Java stored procedures. This does not fit into the classification scheme above, although it would likely resemble either a type 2 or type 4 driver (depending on whether the database itself is implemented in Java or not). An example of this is the KPRB (Kernel Program Bundled) driver
supplied with  Oracle RDBMS. "jdbc:default:connection" offers a relatively standard way of making such a connection (at least the Oracle database and Apache Derby support it). However, in the case of an internal JDBC driver, the JDBC client actually runs as part of the database being accessed, and so can access data directly rather than through network protocols.

Sources
 Oracle provides a list of some JDBC drivers and vendors
 Simba Technologies ships an SDK for building custom JDBC Drivers for any custom/proprietary relational data source
 CData Software ships type 4 JDBC Drivers for various applications, databases, and Web APIs.
 RSSBus Type 4 JDBC Drivers for applications, databases, and web services
 DataDirect Technologies provides a comprehensive suite of fast Type 4 JDBC drivers for all major database they advertise as Type 5
 IDS Software provides a Type 3 JDBC driver for concurrent access to all major databases. Supported features include resultset caching, SSL encryption, custom data source, dbShield
 JDBaccess is a Java persistence library for MySQL and Oracle which defines major database access operations in an easy usable API above JDBC
 JNetDirect provides a suite of fully Sun J2EE certified high-performance JDBC drivers.
 JDBCR4 is a service program written by Scott Klement to allow access to JDBC from RPG on the IBM i.
 HSQLDB is a RDBMS with a JDBC driver and is available under a BSD license.
 SchemaCrawler is an open source API that leverages JDBC, and makes database metadata available as plain old Java objects (POJOs)

See also
 GNU Data Access (GDA)
 JDBCFacade
 Open Database Connectivity (ODBC)
 Object–relational mapping (ORM)

References

External links

 
  API Javadoc documentation
  API Javadoc documentation
 O/R Broker Scala JDBC framework
 SqlTool Open source, command-line, generic JDBC client utility.  Works with any JDBC-supporting database.
 JDBC URL Strings and related information of All Databases.

Java platform
Java specification requests
SQL data access
Java APIs
Database APIs